Bichler is a surname. Notable people with the surname include:

Florian Bichler (born 1991), German footballer 
Heinrich Bichler (1466–1497), Swiss painter
Hubert Bichler (born 1959), German sport shooter
Nicholas J. Bichler (1895–1961), American politician
Nimrod Bichler (born 1974), Israeli wheelchair tennis coach
Shimshon Bichler, Israeli political economist
Timo Bichler (born 1999), German racing cyclist
William J. Bichler (1870-1926), American politician